is a Japanese basketball-themed manga series written and illustrated by Takeshi Hinata. It has been serialized in Kodansha's Weekly Shōnen Magazine since December 2003, with its chapters collected in 51 tankōbon volumes as of June 2019. A 50-episode anime television series adaptation produced by Diomedéa was broadcast from October 2019 to September 2020.

Plot
Sora Kurumatani made a promise to his mother, "I will dominate my first high school tournament". But as he joins the basketball club after entering Kuzuryū High School, he finds out that it's become a stomping ground for delinquents. A place where everything but basketball is done, but with Sora's genuine zeal for basketball, things begin to stir.

Characters

Media

Manga
Ahiru no Sora, written and illustrated by Takeshi Hinata, began in Kodansha's Weekly Shōnen Magazine on December 10, 2003. In January 2019, Hinata announced that the manga has entered its final arc. Kodansha has compiled its chapters into individual tankōbon. The first volume was published on May 15, 2004. As of June 17, 2019, fifty-one volumes have been released.

Volume list

Anime
An anime television series adaptation was announced on February 28, 2018. The series is directed by Shingo Tamaki, with Keizō Kusakawa serving as chief director, and written by Gō Zappa, with animation by Diomedéa. Character designs are provided by Yoshino Honda, and Hiroaki Tsutsumi is composing the music. The series aired from October 2, 2019 to September 30, 2020 on TV Tokyo, AT-X, and BS TV Tokyo. It ran for four cours. The opening theme song is "Happy Go Ducky!" by The Pillows, while the ending theme song is "Tsubasa" by saji. The second opening theme song is "Never Mind" by Flumpool, while the ending theme song is "Over" by Yuma Uchida.

Sentai Filmworks has licensed the series worldwide excluding Asia. The Dubcast premiered on November 13, 2019. Muse Communication has licensed the series in Asia-Pacific and streamed it on Muse Asia YouTube channel and Netflix.

Episode list

Reception
Several volumes of the series appeared on Oricon's list of best-selling manga volumes from 2009 to 2011. It was the 23rd best-selling manga series in Japan in 2011, with 1,739,105 copies sold. By February 2018, the manga had over 24 million copies in circulation.

Notes

References

External links
 
 

2003 manga
2019 anime television series debuts
Anime series based on manga
Basketball in anime and manga
Crunchyroll anime
Diomedéa
Kodansha manga
Muse Communication
School life in anime and manga
Sentai Filmworks
Shōnen manga
TV Tokyo original programming